Caio Oliveira de Sena Bonfim (born 19 March 1991) is a Brazilian racewalker. In the 20 km walk, he was a bronze medalist at the 2017 World Championships and finished 4th at the 2016 Olympic Games. His mother, Gianetti Bonfim, was also an international racewalker for Brazil.

He competed in the 20 km walk at the 2012 Summer Olympics, where he placed 39th.

At the 2015 Pan American Games, he won a bronze medal in the Men's 20 kilometres walk with a time of 1:24:43.

At the 2015 IAAF World Championships, he finished 6th with a time of 1:20:44.

At the 2016 Summer Olympics in Rio de Janeiro, Bonfim competed well. In the Men's 20 kilometres walk, he finished 4th with a time of 1:19:42, a Brazilian record, just 5 seconds behind the bronze medalist. In the Men's 50 kilometres walk, he finished 9th, again breaking the Brazilian record with a time of 3:47:02.

At the 2017 World Championships held in London, Bonfim won the bronze medal, the first for a Brazilian in this sport, again lowering his Brazilian record, with a mark of 1:19:04.

At the 2019 Pan American Games held in Lima, he won the silver medal in the 20 km, just 7 seconds behind Ecuadorian Brian Daniel Alvez.

He qualified to represent Brazil at the 2020 Summer Olympics.

Personal bests

Road walk
10 km: 39:13 min –  Madrid, 16 May 2022
20 km: 1:18:47 hrs –  La Coruña, 8 Jun 2019
50 km: 3:47:02 hrs –  Rio de Janeiro, 19 Aug 2016

Track walk
5000 m: 19:47.99 min –  Fortaleza, 11 May 2011
10,000 m: 39:57.59 min (ht) –  La Nucia, 21 May 2022
20,000 m: 1:20:13.68h hrs (ht) –  Bragança Paulista, 25 April 2021

International competitions

References

External links
 
 
 

1991 births
Living people
Sportspeople from Brasília
Brazilian male racewalkers
Olympic athletes of Brazil
Athletes (track and field) at the 2012 Summer Olympics
Athletes (track and field) at the 2016 Summer Olympics
Athletes (track and field) at the 2020 Summer Olympics
World Athletics Championships medalists
World Athletics Championships athletes for Brazil
Athletes (track and field) at the 2011 Pan American Games
Athletes (track and field) at the 2019 Pan American Games
Pan American Games athletes for Brazil
Pan American Games silver medalists for Brazil
Pan American Games bronze medalists for Brazil
Pan American Games medalists in athletics (track and field)
South American Games bronze medalists for Brazil
South American Games medalists in athletics
Competitors at the 2010 South American Games
Medalists at the 2019 Pan American Games
20th-century Brazilian people
21st-century Brazilian people